Our Lady of the Holy Rosary Parish is a Roman Catholic parish designated for Polish immigrants in Taunton, Massachusetts, United States.

Founded in 1927, it was one of the Polish-American Roman Catholic parishes in New England in the Diocese of Fall River.

Currently, the church serves Portuguese speaking community with an incoming priest.

Bibliography 
 
 The Official Catholic Directory in USA

External links 
 Our Lady of the Holy Rosary Parish - ParishesOnline.com
 Our Lady of the Holy Rosary Parish - TheCatholicDirectory.com 
 Diocese of Fall River

Polish-American Roman Catholic parishes in Massachusetts
Roman Catholic parishes of Diocese of Fall River